This is a list of notable former pupils and staff of Emanuel School, London, England.

Notable Old Emanuels

Armed forces

 Sholto Douglas, 1st Baron Douglas of Kirtleside GCB, MC, DFC – Marshal of the Royal Air Force, at Emanuel 1904–1905
 Major Edward Thomas MC – noted for his part in the Battle of Hellfire Pass

Arts and entertainment

 Naveen Andrews – actor, star of Lost, and The English Patient
 John Banting – artist 
 Alan Caddy – guitarist with The Tornados
 Derek Davis – ceramic artist
 Rupert Degas – actor
 Hero Fiennes-Tiffin – actor
 Jack Hedley – actor 
 Leslie Henson – actor
 Douglas Hickox – film director
 Chris Hughes – record producer, and Adam and the Ants drummer, aka Merrick
William Lovelock – composer and pedagogue
 Richard Marquand – film director, director of Return of the Jedi
 Ben Moore – artist and curator 
 Gordon Murray – puppeteer (Camberwick Green, Chigley, Trumpton)
 Joseph Quinn – actor (Stranger Things, Catherine the Great)
 Mick Rock – rock photographer

Clergy

 Barney Hopkinson – formerly Rector of Wimborne Minster 1981–1986; Archdeacon of Sarum 1986–1998; and Archdeacon of Wilts 1998–2004
 J. B. Phillips – theologian and clergyman

Industry

 Neil Carson OBE – formerly CEO Johnson Matthey PLC

Literature

 Vernon Richards – anarchist writer and photographer
 N. F. Simpson – dramatist
 Michael Vince – poet and author 
 Clive Wilmer – poet and Fellow of Fitzwilliam College and Sidney Sussex College, Cambridge

Media
Michael Aldred – co-presenter of Ready Steady Go!
Michael Aspel OBE – broadcaster
Clive Barnes – theatre critic
Simon Barnes – chief sports correspondent for The Times
Bill Boorne – Theatre Critic & Journalist
Andi Peters – television presenter and producer
Paul Rambali – Music journalist & author

Other professions

Charles Walter Clark FRIBA – main architect for the Metropolitan Line on the London Underground
Michel Roux Jr – Two-starred Michelin chef and restaurateur and presenter of Masterchef
Tomasz Starzewski – designer

Politics, public administration, and diplomacy

 The Rt Hon Richard Adams MP – politician, formerly Lord Commissioner of the Treasury
 Sir Alfred Butt MP – politician, theatre manager, race horse owner and breeder
 Ernest Crutchley CB, CMG, CBE – Minister (Political)/Deputy High Commissioner Australia
 Sir Arthur Galsworthy KCMG – British Ambassador to Ireland and formerly British High Commissioner to New Zealand
 Sir John Galsworthy KCVO, CMG – British Ambassador to Mexico
 Baron Hain of Neath, PC – formerly Secretary of State for Wales; previously Secretary of State for Work and Pensions, Secretary of State for Northern Ireland; Leader of the House of Commons and Lord Privy Seal
 The Rt Hon Geoffrey Robinson MP – formerly Paymaster General
 Mark MacGregor – politician, formerly Conservative Party chief executive
 Matthew Taylor – chief executive of the Royal Society of Arts
 Charles Wilfrid Scott-Giles OBE, FSA – Fitzalan Pursuivant of Arms Extraordinary
 Sir Sebastian Wood KCMG – British Ambassador to Germany; formerly British Ambassador to China, and Principal Private Secretary to the Cabinet

Professors and distinguished thinkers

 Professor Sir Tim Berners-Lee OM, KBE, FRS, FRSA, FREng, DFBCS – inventor of the World Wide Web, recipient of the Millennium Technology Prize and professor at MIT
 Edward Bowell – astronomer, Lowell Observatory
 Professor Tony Brooker – Emeritus Professor of Computer Science, University of Essex
 Professor J Duncan M Derrett – Emeritus Professor of Oriental Laws, University of London
 Professor Derek Fray FRS, FREng – Professor of Materials Chemistry, and Fellow, Fitzwilliam College, Cambridge;  formerly Assistant Professor of Metallurgy at MIT
 Professor Robert Gibson – Emeritus Professor of Engineering Science, King's College, London
 A. C. Gimson – phonetician and head of the department of phonetics and linguistics, UCL
 Professor Peter Goddard CBE, FRS  – mathematical physicist, director of the Institute for Advanced Study, Princeton; formerly Master  of St John's College, Cambridge; Honorary Fellow Isaac Newton Institute
 Professor Ivor James – professor of cello, Royal College of Music
 Professor Tony Judt FBA – historian, and Erich Maria Remarque Professor in European Studies, New York University. Nominated for the 2006 Pulitzer Prize for General Non-Fiction.
 Tom Kemp – Marxist economic historian and political theorist; formerly Reader in Economic History at the University of Hull
 William Lovelock – composer
 George Lyward OBE – educationalist, teacher, (Emanuel School, Glenalmond College, and The Perse School under W. H. D. Rouse), and founder of Finchden Manor progressive community for young people
Professor David Marquand FBA, FRSA, FRHistS – academic, visiting fellow and formerly principal of Mansfield College, Oxford; ex-Labour Party MP and SDP co-founder
 Professor Mark Miodownik MBE – materials scientist, University College London
 Professor Denis Noble CBE, FRS, FRCP (Hon), Emeritus Professor and co-Director of Computational Physiology, Balliol College, Oxford; formerly Burdon Sanderson Professor of Cardiovascular Physiology
 Professor John Paynter OBE, FRSA – composer and Emeritus Professor of Music University of York
Edward P.F. Rose – paleontologist and geologist
 Professor Sir Owen Saunders Kt, FRS, FREng – Emeritus Professor of Mechanical Engineering, Fellow, and formerly Rector of Imperial College, London and Vice-Chancellor of the University of London

Royalty and other nobility 

 His Royal Highness Prince Abdul Hakeem Jefri Bolkiah of Brunei

Sport

Rowing

 Clint Evans – member of the 2005 Atlantic Rowing Race, overall winning crew and winning pairs team: C2
 Malcolm McGowan – Great Britain Olympic oarsman 1980; silver medalist Men's Coxed Eights & 1984 Finalist
 Anton Obholzer – Great Britain Olympic oarsman in Seoul (1988). Member of GB Eight that came 4th.
 Clive Roberts – Great Britain Olympic oarsman in Los Angeles (1984). Member of GB Eight that came 5th.

Rugby

 George Littlewood Hirst – Wales and Barbarians rugby international 1912–1914
 Tom Smith – Scotland and Lions rugby International

Cricket
 John Cole (1907–1997), first-class cricketer and British Army officer
 Ian Payne – cricketer
 Stuart Surridge – cricketer
 Leonard Shelton Heath Summers – cricketer

Notable Masters

 J. A. Cuddon – Writer, works include A Dictionary of Literary Terms and Literary Theory
 Tristram Jones-Parry – Headmaster of Emanuel School 1994–1998; Headmaster of Westminster School 1998–2004

References

Emanuels